Kenard Dushun Lang (born January 31, 1975) is a former American football defensive end who played in the National Football League.  He played for the Cleveland Browns, Washington Redskins, and Denver Broncos.

High school years
Lang attended Maynard Evans High School in Orlando and was a letterman in football, basketball, and baseball.

College and professional career
Lang played college football at the University of Miami. He was part of the 10-1 1994 Hurricanes squad who played in the Orange Bowl.

Lang was drafted 17th overall in the 1997 NFL draft by The Washington Redskins where he played through the 2001 season. He would then sign with The Cleveland Browns.

During the 2005 season, the Browns attempted to convert Lang to linebacker in their new 3-4 scheme under head coach Romeo Crennel.  The position change was generally considered to be unsuccessful, however, and Lang was released in February 2006.  On March 18, 2006, Lang signed with the Denver Broncos.  The Broncos released him on August 27, 2007.

NFL statistics

Coaching career
Lang coached at Jones High School in Orlando, Florida with Charlie Frye in 2008.  He took a team that was 1–9 in 2007 and turned them into a playoff team in his first season. Lang was the head football coach at Wekiva High School in Apopka, Florida from 2013 to 2015. Lang is now the head coach at his alma mater, Evans High School in Orlando, Florida.

Lang also founded the Kenard Lang Foundation, which focuses on cancer, youth, and education.

References

1975 births
Living people
American football defensive ends
American football defensive tackles
American football linebackers
Cleveland Browns players
Denver Broncos players
Miami Hurricanes football players
Washington Redskins players
High school football coaches in Florida
Players of American football from Orlando, Florida
African-American coaches of American football
African-American players of American football
21st-century African-American sportspeople
20th-century African-American sportspeople
Ed Block Courage Award recipients